"Mujer Latina" is a song by Thalía, released as the fifth single from her fifth album Amor a la Mexicana. In Europe it was released as Vengo! Vengo! (Mujer Latina).

In popular culture
Former Rugby player Kenny Logan danced samba to Mujer Latina on the popular British TV series Strictly Come Dancing (series 5) in 2007. In 2011, Peruvian actress and dancer Leysi Suárez danced to the song on week six of the first season of the popular Peruvian dancing competition El Gran Show. The South Korean figure skating team performed to a medley of songs, which included "Mujer Latina", at the 2018 Winter Olympics in Pyeongchang, South Korea. In March 2019, Country music singer Cliona Hagan danced salsa to the song on week 9 of Dancing with the Stars (Irish series 3).

Music video
Mujer Latina has two official music videos. The first one is the original version, released worldwide in 1997. The second one was only released in Europe and features a totally different footage. The European version is considered rare, since it’s not available online in great image  quality. Both videos were directed by Gustavo Garzon.

Commercial performance
The song had airplay success in Latin American radio stations and reached the top spot in Chile. It reached  number two in Guatemala, thirteen in Spain, and also had success in some European countries such as Turkey and Greece. The first music video for "Mujer Latina" was nominated for Video of the Year at the Premio Lo Nuestro 1998

The song was also well received by critics. Joey Guerra from Vibe called the "A fiery hip-swiveling rhythm which effortlessly blended independent-woman themes with Thalía's own sexy persona."

Single
 Mujer Latina (album version) - 3:53

Official versions and remixes
 Mujer Latina (Album Version) - 3:36
 Mujer Latina (Zero Radio Mix) - 3:53
 Mujer Latina (Euro Mix) - 3:11
 Mujer Latina (Spirit Mix) - 3:38
 Mujer Latina (Zero Club Mix) - 6:23

Charts

Awards and nominations
Premio Lo Nuestro 

|-
| 1998 || Mujer Latina || Video of the Year || 
|-
|}

References

External links
Mujer Latina (European Video) Youtube Video
Mujer Latina (Original Video) Youtube Video
Mujer Latina Youtube Video
 

 

Thalía songs
Spanish-language songs
1997 singles
1997 songs
Songs written by Kike Santander

pt:Mujer latina